Labeobarbus wurtzi is a species of ray-finned fish in the genus Labeobarbus from the coastal river bains of Côte d'Ivoire; Ghana; Guinea; Liberia and Sierra Leone.

References

 

wurtzi
Taxa named by Jacques Pellegrin
Fish described in 1908